The men's 1956 United States Olympic trials for track and field for men were held at the Los Angeles Memorial Coliseum in Los Angeles, California, on June 28 and 29.   The 20 kilometer walk trials were held in Pittsburgh, Pennsylvania, on August 26, and the 50 kilometer walk trials were held on September 16 in Baltimore, Maryland. Two marathon trials were held between two races, the AAU National Championships in Yonkers, New York, on September 30 and the Boston Marathon in Boston, Massachusetts, on April 19.  As it turned out, the three selectees were the top 3 Americans at both events.  The 10,000 meters was held in Bakersfield, California on June 23.

The decathlon was held two weeks after the trials on July 13-4 in Crawfordsville, Indiana allowing athletes to make attempts in individual events.  Rafer Johnson qualified in the long jump but didn't jump in Melbourne. Bob Richards qualified in the Decathlon after winning the pole vault in his attempt to repeat as Olympic pole vault champion.  He did compete in both events in Melbourne, successfully winning the pole vault, but after scoring in 11th place through nine events, he chose not to suffer through a 1500 and did not finish. The process was organized by the AAU.

The women's Olympic trials were held separately at American University (Reeves Field) in Washington, D.C. on August 25th.

Men's results
Key:
.

Men track events

Men field events

Women's results

Women track events

Women field events

References

US Olympic Trials
Track, Outdoor
United States Summer Olympics Trials